Gu Guangming (born January 31, 1959, in Guangzhou) is a former Chinese professional football player and manager. Nicknamed "The Weatherfish" because of his ability to dribble out of tight spaces on the flanks and in the corners while avoiding tackles, Gu played for the Guangdong provincial team in the semi-professional Chinese Jia League from 1976 to 1985 and became the second Chinese player to play in a European professional league when he played for SV Darmstadt 98 in the German 2. Bundesliga from 1987 to 1992. On the international level, he played for the China national team from 1979 to 1985, participating in the 1982 and the 1986 FIFA World Cup qualifications.

Playing career
Gu was considered a highly talented young player and joined top tier Chinese Jia League side Guangdong provincial team by the 1976 league season. He soon went on to play for the Chinese National Junior Team before Gu went on to see his club win the Chinese league title at the end of the 1979 league season before being called up to the Chinese national team for the first time. With the national team he went on to be in the squads that took part in the 1980 and 1984 AFC Asian Cup third placed team, while also participating in the 1982 and the 1986 FIFA World Cup qualifications.

In 1985, Gu suffered a broken right tibia injury in a domestic match against the Beijing football team, and was forced out of all competitions for almost two years. In 1987, he made a comeback in Germany and played for five seasons with SV Darmstadt 98 in the  2. Bundesliga from 1987 to 1993, becoming the first footballer from the People's Republic of China to play in a European professional league.

Honours

Club
Guangdong
Chinese Jia-A League: 1979

Individual
 National Best XI: 1980–1983
 AFC All-Star Team: 1985
 Voted "Favorite Football Player in China" by fans: 1986

References

External links
Player profile at Sodasoccer

1959 births
Living people
People from Shaoguan
Chinese football managers
Chinese footballers
Footballers from Shaoguan
China international footballers
tuS Koblenz players
SV Darmstadt 98 players
2. Bundesliga players
Chinese expatriate footballers
Expatriate footballers in Germany
Chinese expatriate sportspeople in Germany
1980 AFC Asian Cup players
1984 AFC Asian Cup players
Association football wingers